The Vanishing Race is the twelfth album by British/Australian soft rock duo Air Supply, released in 1993. Although the album failed to reach the US charts, its single "Goodbye" peaked at No. 48 on the Adult Contemporary chart. The album became especially relevant in Asia, where singles "Goodbye", which reached No. 1 in several Asian countries, and "It's Never Too Late" helped the album reach platinum certification. The album sold over 4 million copies worldwide.

Track listing
"It's Never Too Late" (Graham Russell, Michael Sherwood) - 6:01
"Faith" (Rick Hahn, George Thatcher) - 4:53
"Kiss Me Like You Mean It" (Graham Russell, Guy Allison, Clifford Rehrig) - 4:27
"Evidence of Love" (Steve Diamond, Chris Farron) - 4:40
"Goodbye" (David Foster, Linda Thompson) - 4:05
"The Vanishing Race" (Graham Russell, Larry Antonino, Michael Sherwood) - 5:39
"Don't Tell Me" (Graham Russell, Jimmy Haun, Michael Sherwood) - 4:51
"Too Sentimental" (Brad Buxer, Graham Russell) - 3:54
"I Remember Love" (Graham Russell, Michael Sherwood) - 4:27
"I'll Be Thinking of You" (Graham Russell) - 4:26

Personnel 
 Russell Hitchcock – lead vocals (1–3, 5, 8–10), backing vocals (1–3, 6–8)
 Graham Russell – lead vocals (1, 3–7), backing vocals (1-3, 6–9), arrangements (1, 3, 4, 6, 7, 9, 10) acoustic guitar (1, 3, 6), electric guitar (7), acoustic piano (10)
 Michael Thompson – electric guitar (1, 3, 5, 9)
 Tim Pierce – electric guitar (2, 3, 6)
 Dean Parks – acoustic guitar (4, 5)
 Guy Allison – keyboards (1–4, 6, 7, 9, 10), programming (7), acoustic piano (10)
 Simon Franglen – Synclavier (1), Synclavier programming (5)
 Rick Hahn – keyboard programming (2), drum programming (2)
 Robbie Buchanan – keyboards (4, 10)
 Claude Gaudette – keyboards (5), drum programming (5, 8), Moog bass (8)
 Brad Buxer – keyboards (8), percussion programming (8)
 Billy Sherwood – 8-string bass (1), 5-string bass (1)
 Leland Sklar – bass (3, 6) 
 Neil Stubenhaus – bass (6, 7, 9)
 Clifford Rehrig – stick bass (9, 10)
 Michael Baird – drums (1)
 Vinnie Colaiuta – drums (3, 6, 9)
 Rafael Padilla – percussion (1–5, 9)
 Paulinho da Costa – percussion (6, 7)
 Steve Tavaglione – saxophone (4, 7, 8)
 Anita Sherman – backing vocals (1, 3)
 Jessica Williams – backing vocals (1, 3)
 Warren Wiebe – backing vocals (2)
 Quiltman – backing vocals (6), Indian chant and prayer (6)
 Michael Sherwood – backing vocals (6)

Production 
 Producer, Engineer and Mixing – Humberto Gatica
 Executive Producer – Graham Russell
 Assistant Producer and Engineer –  Felipe Elgueta
 A&R – Jeff Aldrich
 Production Coordination – Tony DeFranco
 Mix Assistant – Alejandro Rodriguez
 Mastered by George Marino at Sterling Sound (New York, NY).
 Cover Artwork – Brett-Livingstone Strong
 Photography – Dean Armstrong

References

1993 albums
Air Supply albums
Albums produced by Humberto Gatica
Giant Records (Warner) albums